Deliverance is a 1972 American thriller film produced and directed by John Boorman, and starring Jon Voight, Burt Reynolds, Ned Beatty, and Ronny Cox, with the latter two making their feature film debuts. The screenplay was adapted by James Dickey from his 1970 novel of the same name. The film was a critical and box office success, earning three Academy Award nominations and five Golden Globe Award nominations.

Widely acclaimed as a landmark picture, the film is noted for a music scene near the beginning, with one of the city men playing "Dueling Banjos" on guitar with a banjo-picking country boy. It is also notorious for its brutal depiction of a sodomous rape, before which the victim is compelled to "squeal like a pig" by his attacker. In 2008, Deliverance was selected for preservation in the United States National Film Registry by the Library of Congress as being "culturally, historically, or aesthetically significant."

Plot
Four Atlanta businessmen—Lewis Medlock, Ed Gentry, Bobby Trippe and Drew Ballinger—decide to canoe down a river in the remote northern Georgia wilderness before it is dammed. Lewis, an experienced outdoorsman, is the leader; his close friend Ed has been on several trips but lacks Lewis's machismo, while Bobby and Drew are novices. En route to their launch site, the men (Bobby in particular) are condescending towards the locals, who are unimpressed by the "city boys". At a local gas station, Drew, with his guitar, engages a young banjo-playing boy in a musical duel ("Dueling Banjos"). The duel is mutually enjoyable, and some of the locals break into dance at the sound of it. However, the boy does not acknowledge Drew when prompted for a celebratory handshake.

The four friends travel in pairs and their two canoes become separated. Ed and Bobby encounter a pair of mountain men emerging from the woods, one carrying a shotgun and missing two front teeth. Following a verbal altercation, Bobby is forced by the men to undress and the unarmed man sodomizes him, demanding he "squeal like a pig", while Ed is bound to a tree and held at gunpoint. After Bobby is raped, Lewis sneaks up and kills the rapist using his bow and arrow; Ed retrieves the gun and the remaining mountain man flees into the woods. After a brief but hotheaded debate between Lewis and Drew, Ed and Bobby vote to side with Lewis's plan to bury the body and continue on as if nothing had happened. The four continue downriver but the canoes reach a dangerous stretch of rapids. As Drew and Ed reach the rapids in the lead canoe, Drew shakes his head and falls headlong into the water — it is unclear why.

The canoes collide on the rocks, spilling the three remaining men into the river. One of the canoes is smashed. Lewis breaks his femur and the others are washed ashore alongside him in a gorge. Lewis, who believes Drew has been shot, encourages Ed to climb to the top of the gorge and dispatch the other mountain man, whom they believe to be stalking them from above. Ed reaches an overhang and hides out until morning, when a man appears above him with a rifle; Ed clumsily shoots and manages to kill him, but falls backwards, stabbing himself with one of his own arrows in the process. The dead man seemingly has all his teeth, but on closer inspection, is revealed to be wearing dentures. Ed and Bobby weigh down the body in the river to ensure it will never be found, and when they encounter Drew's body downriver, they do the same.

Upon finally reaching the small town of Aintry, they take Lewis to the hospital. The men carefully concoct a cover story for the authorities about Drew's death, lying about their ordeal to Sheriff Bullard in order to escape a possible double murder charge. The sheriff does not believe them, but has no evidence to arrest them and tells the men to not do this kind of thing again and to never come back. The trio vow to keep their story of death and survival a secret for the rest of their lives. In the final scene, Ed awakens, startled by a nightmare in which a bloated hand rises from the lake.

Cast

 Jon Voight as Ed Gentry
 Burt Reynolds as Lewis Medlock
 Ned Beatty as Bobby Trippe
 Ronny Cox as Drew Ballinger
 Bill McKinney as Mountain Man
 Herbert "Cowboy" Coward as Toothless Man
 James Dickey as Sheriff Bullard
 Billy Redden as Lonnie, the banjo boy
 Macon McCalman as Deputy Queen, whose brother-in-law is missing

Ned Beatty's wife, Belinda Beatty, and director John Boorman's son, Charley Boorman, have brief appearances as the wife and young child of Jon Voight's character.

Production

Deliverance was shot primarily in Rabun County in northeastern Georgia. The canoe scenes were filmed in the Tallulah Gorge southeast of Clayton and on the Chattooga River. This river divides the northeastern corner of Georgia from the northwestern corner of South Carolina. Additional scenes were shot in Salem, South Carolina.

A scene was also shot at the Mount Carmel Baptist Church cemetery. This site has since been flooded and lies  under the surface of Lake Jocassee, on the border between Oconee and Pickens counties in South Carolina. The dam shown under construction is Jocassee Dam near Salem, SC.

During the filming of the canoe scene, author James Dickey showed up inebriated and entered into a bitter argument with producer-director John Boorman, who had rewritten Dickey's script. They allegedly had a brief fistfight in which Boorman, a much smaller man than Dickey, suffered a broken nose and four shattered teeth. Dickey was thrown off the set, but no charges were filed against him. The two reconciled and became good friends, and Boorman gave Dickey a cameo role as the sheriff at the end of the film.

The inspiration for the Cahulawassee River was the Coosawattee River, which was dammed in the 1970s and contained several dangerous whitewater rapids before being flooded by Carters Lake.

Casting 
Casting was by Lynn Stalmaster. Dickey had initially wanted Sam Peckinpah to direct the film. Dickey also wanted Gene Hackman to portray Ed Gentry whereas Boorman wanted Lee Marvin to play the role.  Boorman also wanted Marlon Brando to play Lewis Medlock. Jack Nicholson was considered for the role of Ed, while both Donald Sutherland and Charlton Heston turned down the role of Lewis.  Other actors who were considered for the film included Robert Redford, Henry Fonda, George C. Scott and Warren Beatty.

Stunts 

The film is infamous for the cost cutting by the studio in an effort to kill it and having the actors perform their own stunts, such as Jon Voight notably climbing the cliff himself. Reynolds requested to have one scene re-shot with himself in a canoe rather than a dummy as it tumbled over a real waterfall. Reynolds recalled his shoulder and head hitting rocks and floating downstream with all of his clothes torn off, then waking up with director Boorman at his bedside. Reynolds asked "How'd it look?" and Boorman said, "It looked like a dummy falling over a waterfall."
Beatty almost drowned and Reynolds cracked his tailbone.

Regarding the courage of the four main actors in the movie performing their own stunts without insurance protection, Dickey was quoted as saying all of them "had more guts than a burglar." In a nod to their stunt-performing audacity, early in the movie Lewis says, "Insurance? I've never been insured in my life. I don't believe in insurance. There's no risk".

"Squeal like a pig"
Several people have been credited with the phrase "squeal like a pig", the now-famous line spoken during the graphic rape scene. Ned Beatty said he thought of it while he and actor Bill McKinney (who played Beatty's rapist) were improvising the scene. James Dickey's son, Christopher Dickey, wrote in his memoir about the film production, Summer of Deliverance, that because Boorman had rewritten so much dialogue for the scene one of the crewmen suggested that Beatty's character should just "squeal like a pig". Boorman, in a DVD commentary he made for the film said the line was used because the studio wanted the male rape scene to be filmed in two ways: one for cinematic release and one that would be acceptable for television. As Boorman did not want to do that, he decided that the phrase "squeal like a pig", suggested by Rabun County liaison Frank Rickman, was a good replacement for the original dialogue in the script. Reynolds later recalled the scene as so uncomfortable cameramen avoided watching, and Reynolds opted to interrupt the filming. Reynolds said, "I asked John Boorman, the director, 'Why did you let it go that long?' He said, 'I wanted to take it as far as I could with the audience, and I figured you'd run in when it got too far.'"

Soundtrack and copyright dispute
The film's soundtrack brought new attention to the musical work "Dueling Banjos", which had been recorded numerous times since 1955. Only Eric Weissberg and Steve Mandel were originally credited for the piece. The onscreen credits state that the song is an arrangement of the song "Feudin' Banjos", showing Combine Music Corp as the copyright owner. Songwriter and producer Arthur "Guitar Boogie" Smith, who had written "Feudin' Banjos" in 1955, and recorded it with five-string banjo player Don Reno, filed a lawsuit for songwriting credit and a percentage of royalties. He was awarded both in a landmark copyright infringement case. Smith asked Warner Bros. to include his name on the official soundtrack listing, but reportedly asked to be omitted from the film credits because he found the film offensive.

No credit was given for the film score. The film has a number of sparse, brooding passages of music scattered throughout, including several played on a synthesizer. Some prints of the movie omit much of this extra music.

Boorman was given a gold record for the "Dueling Banjos" hit single; this was later stolen from his house by the Dublin gangster Martin Cahill. Boorman recreated this scene in The General (1998), his biographical film about Cahill.

Charts

Reception
Deliverance was a box office success in the United States, becoming the fifth-highest grossing film of 1972, with a domestic take of over $46 million. The film's financial success continued the following year, when it went on to earn $18 million in North American "distributor rentals" (receipts).

Critical reception
Deliverance was well received by critics and is widely regarded as one of the best films of 1972. On review aggregation website Rotten Tomatoes, the film holds an 89% rating based on reviews from 62 critics, with an average rating of 8.40/10. The site's consensus states: "Given primal verve by John Boorman's unflinching direction and Burt Reynolds' star-making performance, Deliverance is a terrifying adventure." 

Gene Siskel of the Chicago Tribune gave the film four stars out of four and wrote, "It is a gripping horror story that at times may force you to look away from the screen, but it is so beautifully filmed that your eyes will eagerly return." Charles Champlin of the Los Angeles Times called it "an engrossing adventure, a demonstrable labor of love" carried by Voight and Reynolds. Gary Arnold of The Washington Post wrote that the film was "certainly a distinctive and gripping piece of work, with a deliberately brooding, ominous tone and visual style that put you in a grave, fearful frame of mind, almost in spite of yourself."

Not all reviews were positive. Roger Ebert of the Chicago Sun-Times gave the film a mixed 2.5 stars out of a possible 4. He declared the film was "admittedly effective on the level of simple adventure" and had good performances, particularly from Voight and Reynolds. However, Ebert also wrote Deliverance "totally fails [in] its attempt to make some kind of significant statement about its action [...] It's possible to consider civilized men in a confrontation with the wilderness without throwing in rapes, cowboy-and-Indian stunts and pure exploitative sensationalism."

Arthur D. Murphy of Variety wrote that the setting was "majestic" but it was "in the fleshing out that the script fumbles, and with it the direction and acting." Vincent Canby of The New York Times was also generally negative, calling the film "a disappointment" because "so many of Dickey's lumpy narrative ideas remain in his screenplay that John Boorman's screen version becomes a lot less interesting than it has any right to be."

"Dueling Banjos" won the 1974 Grammy Award for Best Country Instrumental Performance. The film was selected by The New York Times as one of The Best 1,000 Movies Ever Made, while the viewers of Channel 4 in the United Kingdom voted it #45 on a list of The 100 Greatest Films.  Reynolds later called it "the best film I've ever been in". However, he stated that the rape scene went "too far".

Awards and nominations

Nominated 
 Academy Award for Best Picture
 Academy Award for Best Director — John Boorman
 Academy Award for Best Film Editing — Tom Priestley
 New York Film Critics Circle for Best Film and Best Director
 Golden Globe Award for Best Motion Picture – Drama
 Golden Globe Award for Best Director – Motion Picture — John Boorman
 Golden Globe Award for Best Actor – Motion Picture Drama — Jon Voight
 Golden Globe Award for Best Original Song — Arthur "Guitar Boogie" Smith, Eric Weissberg, and Steve Mandel
 Golden Globe Award for Best Screenplay — James Dickey

American Film Institute lists
 AFI's 100 Years...100 Thrills—#15

Legacy
Following the film's release, Governor Jimmy Carter established a state film commission to encourage television and movie production in Georgia.  The state has "become one of the top five production destinations in the U.S". Tourism increased to Rabun County by the tens of thousands after the film's release. By 2012, tourism was the largest source of revenue in the county, and rafting had developed as a $20 million industry in the region. Jon Voight's stunt double for this film, Claude Terry, later purchased equipment used in the movie from Warner Brothers. He founded a whitewater rafting adventure company on the Chattooga River, Southeastern Expeditions. Payson Kennedy, the stunt double for Ned Beatty, established the Nantahala Outdoor Center with his wife and Horace Holden along the Nantahala River in Swain County, North Carolina in 1972, the same year that Deliverance was released.

See also
 List of American films of 1972
 Survival film, about the film genre, with a list of related films

References

Further reading
 Tibbetts, John C., and James M. Welsh, eds. The Encyclopedia of Novels Into Film (2nd ed. 2005) pp 94–95.

External links

 
 
 
 Weekend in Aintry! James Dickey and The Making of Deliverance
 Pictures of some deleted scenes
 Deliverance essay by Daniel Eagan in America's Film Legacy: The Authoritative Guide to the Landmark Movies in the National Film Registry, A&C Black, 2010 , pages 686-688 

American survival films
1970s adventure films
1970s thriller drama films
American adventure drama films
American thriller drama films
Films based on American novels
Films directed by John Boorman
Films set in Appalachia
Films set in Atlanta
Films set in forests
Films set in Georgia (U.S. state)
Films shot in Georgia (U.S. state)
Films shot in North Carolina
Films shot in South Carolina
American rape and revenge films
Southern Gothic films
United States National Film Registry films
Warner Bros. films
Whitewater films
1972 drama films
1972 films
1970s English-language films
1970s American films